Maurice Nseiri (born 1945) is a Syrian Jewish craftsman skilled in the art of metalwork.

Nseiri studied the art under the tutelage of his father, Sion Nseiri. In 1965, he took over his father's workshop in the Umayyad bazaar. When the Israeli spy Eli Cohen was uncovered and arrested by Syrian security officials in January of that year, a receipt from the Nseiri shop was found in Cohen's possession. The Mukhabarat swept into the Nseiri workshop and arrested Maurice’s father, brother, and all employees.

In 1970, Nseiri closed his workshop and attempted to flee to Israel via Lebanon but was arrested at the border.

Following the Jewish exodus from Syria in the early 1990s, Nseiri emigrated to Canada.

His works can still be found across Damascus at synagogues and churches, the Sheraton Damascus Hotel as well as at the Syrian Presidential Palace where he created the front brass gates, lamps and other items.

References

1945 births
Canadian Sephardi Jews
Canadian people of Syrian-Jewish descent
Living people
People from Damascus
Syrian emigrants to Canada
Syrian Jews